Nicolette Louisa "Nikki" Palikat (born 1 November 1985) is a Malaysian American singer from Tambunan, Sabah, and a finalist in the first season of Malaysian Idol. She is known for her vocal belting and her ability to sing in the whistle register.

Career
While a university student, she successfully auditioned for Malaysian Idol in Kuching, Sarawak, impressing the judges with her rendition of Mariah Carey's Emotions. She eventually progressed through to the 'Final 12' of the competition. After six weeks, Nikki was voted out on 12 September 2004 to some controversy, as she had been seen as a favourite to win by Malaysian Idol judge, Paul Moss.

The following lists Nikki's Malaysian Idol performances:
 Audition – Emotions – (Mariah Carey)
 Workshop – One Moment in Time – (Whitney Houston)
 Wildcard – The Voice Within – (Christina Aguilera)
 Top 12 – Crazy in Love – (Beyoncé)
 Top 10 – I Want You Back – (The Jackson 5)
 Top 8 – Against All Odds – (Phil Collins)
 Top 7 – I'm with You – (Avril Lavigne)
 Top 6 – Emotion – (Destiny's Child)

Originally planning to continue with her studies after her exit from the competition, Nikki secured a recording contract with Artistes United Records and released her debut album, Maharani, in Malaysia on 28 November 2005. The title means 'Empress' in Malay. This album showcases Nikki's abilities in the whistle register, with one critic mentioning it as "whistling a la Mariah Carey." The ballad 'Pinta' marked Nikki's official debut in the music industry.

Nikki's second single, Caramu, won Nikki and collaborating artist, Zahid, an award for best vocal duo at Anugerah Era 2006, a Malaysian music awards ceremony.

Following Caramu, Nikki teamed up with fellow Malaysian singer, Yanie, and both featured in Ning Baizura's August single release, Drama.

On 28 December 2008, Nikki released her second album, Hawa featuring the singles "Relakan" and "Selamat Tinggal".

Personal life
Palikat married Malaysian music composer and producer Audi Mok in June 2009. They have one son. In 2022, she revealed that she and Mok had split back in March 2021.

Palikat is Catholic.

Discography
Albums
 Maharani (2005)
 Hawa (2008)

Singles
 Caramu
 Imaginasi
 Drama
 Relakan
 Selamat Tinggal
 Cantik
 Belas-Mu
 Hawa
 Sudah

Filmography

Television series

References

External links 
 Nikki Palikat Official Webpage/Blog
 

1985 births
People from Sabah
Kadazan-Dusun people
Living people
Malaysian women pop singers
People from Berrien Springs, Michigan
Malay-language singers
Malaysian Idol participants
21st-century Malaysian women singers
Malaysian Roman Catholics